Zorica Nikolin (born 8 April 1961) is a Serbian chess player who holds the FIDE title of Woman International Master (1982). She is a two-time winner of the Yugoslav Women's Chess Championship (1985, 1987).

Biography
In the 1980s Zorica Nikolin was one of the leading Yugoslav women's chess players. She twice won the Yugoslav Women's Championship in 1985 and 1987. In 1982, she was awarded the FIDE Woman International Master (WIM) title.

She participated three times in the Women's World Chess Championship Interzonal Tournaments:
 In 1982, at Interzonal Tournament in Tbilisi shared 10th-11th place;
 In 1987, at Interzonal Tournament in Tuzla shared 15th-16th place;
 In 1995, at Interzonal Tournament in Chişinău shared 39th-42nd place.

Nikolin played for Yugoslavia in the Women's Chess Olympiads:
 In 1982, at first reserve board in the 10th Chess Olympiad (women) in Lucerne (+3, =4, -3),
 In 1986, at first reserve board in the 27th Chess Olympiad (women) in Dubai (+7, =2, -3),
 In 1990, at second board in the 29th Chess Olympiad (women) in Novi Sad (+5, =3, -1).

References

External links

1961 births
Living people
Serbian female chess players
Yugoslav female chess players
Chess Woman International Masters
Chess Olympiad competitors